Qarapapaq (also, Karapapakh) is a village and municipality in the Qazakh Rayon of Azerbaijan.  It has a population of 1,750.

References 

Populated places in Qazax District